Kim Ian (born Kim Bo-ryung on March 28, 1987) is a South Korean actor and singer.

Career
Kim can play the clarinet and his hobbies include soccer, Taekwondo, the saxophone, and piano.

Kim made his first appearance in f(x)'s endorsement of K-Swiss's 2010 Winter Collection. He was a temporary replacement for Amber for the photoshoot in Petite France (Gapyeong, Gyeonggi-do).

Kim then made his first variety appearance on MBC's 2011 Idol Star Athletics Championships. He was on Team A with label-mates Shinee, Super Junior, TRAX, and The Grace - Dana & Sunday

In 2011, Kim starred in the musical Singin' In The Rain as Donghyun. In 2012 he starred in his second musical Fantasy Couple as Jang Chul Soo with label-mate Sunday of The Grace. The musical was based on the highly rated 2006 drama Fantasy Couple.

In July 2012, Kim was confirmed to play Na Chul Soo in To The Beautiful You, the Korean adaptation of Hana-Kimi. His character's manga counterpart is Oscar M. Himejima, leader of Dormitory 3.

In January 2013, Kim starred as the male lead in Girls' Generation's music video for their lead single "I Got a Boy".

Filmography

Film

Television

Music video

Musical theatre

References

External links
 Daum Profile
 HanCinema

1987 births
Living people
SM Entertainment artists
South Korean male musical theatre actors
South Korean male film actors
South Korean male television actors
South Korean male models
South Korean male singers